Choi Yun-suk (born 5 September 1979) is a South Korean speed skater. She competed in the women's 1500 metres at the 2002 Winter Olympics.

References

1979 births
Living people
South Korean female speed skaters
Olympic speed skaters of South Korea
Speed skaters at the 2002 Winter Olympics
Speed skaters at the 2003 Asian Winter Games
21st-century South Korean women